Kolya is a 1996 Czech drama film about a man whose life is reshaped in an unexpected way. The film was directed by Jan Svěrák and stars his father, Zdeněk Svěrák, who also wrote the script from a story by Pavel Taussig. Kolya earned critical acclaim and won the Academy Award for Best Foreign Language Film and Golden Globe Award for Best Foreign Language Film.

Plot 
The film begins in 1988 as the Soviet Bloc is beginning to disintegrate. František Louka, a middle-aged Czech man dedicated to bachelorhood and the pursuit of women, is a concert cellist struggling to eke out a living by playing funerals at the Prague crematoriums. He has lost his previous job at the Czech Philharmonic, having been half-accidentally blacklisted as "politically unreliable" by the authorities. A friend offers him a chance to earn a great deal of money through a sham marriage to a Soviet woman to enable her to stay in Czechoslovakia. The woman then uses her new citizenship to emigrate to West Germany, where her boyfriend lives.

Due to a concurrence of circumstances, she has to leave behind her 5-year-old son, Kolya, for the disgruntled Czech musician to look after. At first Louka and Kolya have communication difficulties, as they don't speak each other's languages and the many false friend words that exist in Czech and Russian add to the confusion. Gradually, though, a bond forms between Louka and Kolya. The child suffers from suspected meningitis and has to be placed on a course of carefully monitored antibiotics. Louka is threatened with imprisonment for his suspect marriage and the child may be placed in a Soviet children's home. The Velvet Revolution intervenes though, and Kolya is reunited with his mother. Louka and Kolya say their goodbyes.

Louka returns to the Czech Philharmonic and plays Má Vlast with the orchestra under the conductor Rafael Kubelík at the Old Town Square in 1990, while his pregnant girlfriend Klára watches from the crowd.

Cast

Home media
The film was released on DVD and VHS on July 2, 2002.

Reception
The film gained positive reviews. It received Honorable Mention at 53rd Venice International Film Festival.

Box office
In the Czech Republic, the movie's country of origin, over 1.34 million visitors made the movie one of the most successful movies ever. In Germany more than 624,000 tickets were sold for the film.

The film was successful on a limited release in the United States from 24 January 1997 and had taken about $5.73 million by 11 July that year after an opening weekend gross on three screens of $37,795.

Awards 
 Academy Award for Best Foreign Language Film
 Golden Globe Award for Best Foreign Language Film
 Czech Lion 
Best Film
Best Director (Jan Svěrák) 
Best Actress (Libuše Šafránková)
Best Supporting Actor (Andrey Khalimon)
Best Screenplay (Zdeněk Svěrák)
Best Editing (Alois Fišárek)
Tokyo Sakura Grand Prix

See also
 List of submissions to the 69th Academy Awards for Best Foreign Language Film
 List of Czech submissions for the Academy Award for Best Foreign Language Film

References

External links 
 
 
 
 

1996 drama films
1996 films
Best Foreign Language Film Academy Award winners
Best Foreign Language Film Golden Globe winners
Czech Lion Awards winners (films)
1990s Czech-language films
1990s Russian-language films
Slovak-language films
Czech Republic–Russia relations
Films about cellos and cellists
Films about children
Films directed by Jan Svěrák
Films set in Czechoslovakia
Films set in Prague
Films set in the 1980s
Films with screenplays by Zdeněk Svěrák
1996 multilingual films
Czech multilingual films